is a Japanese film and television actress who became known as the first Japanese actress to appear in a nude scene in a mainstream film.

Life and career
Michiko Maeda was born in Osaka Prefecture on February 27, 1934. She was working in a department store in the Nihonbashi district of Tokyo when she began working as an actress at the Shintoho studio in 1955. Her film debut was in director Hiromasa Nomura's Santōshain to Onna Hisho, released in August 1955. Maeda's minor role as a striptease dancer in director Seiichiro Uchikawa's Eikō to Bakusō Ō (1956) brought her to public attention through her voluptuous figure. In their The Japanese Film: Art and Industry, Anderson and Richie described Maeda as "a star who consisted almost entirely of mammary glands."

Shintoho took advantage of Maeda's popularity to cast her in more roles in which she could display her famous figure. Other film studios reportedly engaged in a nationwide search to discover their own buxom models to compete with Maeda. Maeda became notorious for playing the first nude scene in a Japanese film.

While acting in the film Konpira Riseiken (1957) for director Goro Katano, Maeda refused to do a scene in which she was to lift her slip for the camera. 

Maeda was invited to appear in two films in Taiwan in 1963. She returned to Japanese media with the 1972 Nippon Television soap opera, Dakuryū no Onna , and appeared on television and on the stage until her retirement in 1976.

After 42 years of exile from the Japanese film world pink film pioneer Satoru Kobayashi and cult film director Teruo Ishii persuaded her to appear in Ishii's 1999 movie Jigoku: Japanese Hell. Maeda played the role of Enma Daio, the Judge of Hell.

Films
 Kuronekokan ni kieta (1956)
 Revenge of the Pearl Queen (1956)
 Hatoba no Ôja   (1956)
 Onna keirin-ô (1957)

Notes

Bibliography
 
 
 
 
 

1934 births
Japanese actresses
Living people
People from Osaka Prefecture